Julio César "El Pocho" Cortés Lagos (born 29 March 1941) is an Uruguayan football coach and former midfielder who participated in three World Cups with the Uruguay national team.

At the club level, Cortés was most successful during the time he played for Uruguayan club Peñarol, winning two league titles and the Copa Libertadores and the Intercontinental Cup in 1966.

He has spent the majority of his coaching career in Central America, managing several clubs, and having two tenures as coach of the Guatemala national team, which he led to win the 2001 UNCAF Nations Cup tournament.

Playing career
Cortés began his career with Sud América, and in 1962 he joined C.A. Cerro. He left the club in 1965 to play in Argentina for Rosario Central.

Peñarol and international success
After one season with Rosario, Cortés returned to Uruguay to join Peñarol in 1966, and became part of a first team that included players like Pedro Rocha, Alberto Spencer, Julio César Abbadie, and Omar Caetano. The team went on to win the Copa Libertadores in 1966, with Cortés scoring a decisive goal against arch-rivals Nacional in the semifinal playoff on April 23, 1966, which allowed the team to reach the final where they defeated Argentine's River Plate after three matches, obtaining their third Copa Libertadores. Later that year, Cortés helped Peñarol to defeat Spanish champions Real Madrid to win the Intercontinental Cup title. While Cortés was playing for the club, Peñarol also won the domestic league championship in 1967 and 1968.

Cortés joined Mexican Primera División side Atlante F.C. in 1973.

Uruguay national team (1962–1970)
From 1962 to 1970, Cortés appeared in 30 international matches for Uruguay, scoring 3 goals. He made his international debut on 2 May 1962 in a 3–2 victory against Scotland in Glasgow shortly before the 1962 World Cup, at which he played in one match. He also appeared at the 1966 and 1970 finals, being one of six Uruguayan players to be part of three World Cup squads.

At the 1966 World Cup, Cortés scored the eventual match-winning goal against France, one of the two goals Uruguay scored in that match and in the entire tournament. Uruguay was eliminated in quarterfinals by West Germany.

Four years later in Mexico, he played all of Uruguay's six matches, as the team reached semifinals, where they lost to Brazil. With the consolation match against West Germany, Cortés reached an overall total of 11 World Cup matches played, Uruguay's second-highest mark behind goalkeeper and Peñarol teammate Ladislao Mazurkiewicz's 13. The match against the Germans was also his last international match.

Coaching career
After having played in Costa Rica in the late 1970s, Cortés became a coach, and has spent since almost three decades managing several clubs in Costa Rica, Guatemala, and El Salvador.

In 1983, Cortés led Deportivo Suchitepéquez to their only national title to date. Other Guatemalan clubs he coached in the 1980s and 1990s are Juventud Retalteca, CSD Comunicaciones, Xelajú MC, and Aurora F.C. In Costa Rica, he coached Turrialba F.C and Deportivo Saprissa in the 1990s, and in the 2000s, he has coached C.D. Águila of El Salvador, Deportivo Jalapa of Guatemala, and A.D. San Carlos of Costa Rica (2007)He is currently coaching football classes on the "San Jose Indoor Club" Costa Rica .

Guatemala national team (1987–88 and 2000–03)
In 1987, Cortés was named head coach of the Guatemala national team, managing it at that year's Pan American Games. This tenure lasted just over one year until he was replaced by Jorge Roldán in April 1988. Cortés' second period as Guatemala's manager began in June 2000, and ended three years later, in what is one of the longest uninterrupted tenures for a coach of the Guatemalan team. During that time, Guatemala failed to qualify to the 2002 World Cup, but won the 2001 UNCAF Nations Cup – its first international title in 34 years – and finished runner up of that tournaments two years later.

Dispute with the Guatemalan Federation

After being removed from the charge of national coach in April 2003, Cortés sued the Guatemalan football federation (FEDEFUT) for breach of contract, demanding payment of part of his remuneration as national team coach. The coach took the case before FIFA, whom in 2006 ruled that the FEDEFUT pay him part of what he demanded. In September 2006, the FEDEFUT reacted against the coach, accusing him of fraud before a local court, whom dictated that Cortés – who was at the time living in Costa Rica and was at the moment in Guatemala – remained in the country.

Honours
Player
Copa Libertadores winner: 1966
Uruguayan Primera División winner: 1967, 1968
FIFA World Cup fourth place: 1970
Manager
Guatemalan Liga Mayor winner: 1983 (with Suchitepéquez)
Guatemalan domestic cup winner: 1984–85 (with Juventud Retalteca) and 2005 (with Jalapa)
2001 UNCAF Nations Cup winner (with the Guatemala national team)

References

External links

 

1941 births
Living people
Footballers from Montevideo
Uruguayan footballers
Uruguay international footballers
1962 FIFA World Cup players
1966 FIFA World Cup players
1970 FIFA World Cup players
Uruguayan Primera División players
Argentine Primera División players
Liga MX players
North American Soccer League (1968–1984) players
Club de Gimnasia y Esgrima La Plata footballers
Rosario Central footballers
Sud América players
Centro Atlético Fénix players
C.A. Cerro players
Peñarol players
Atlante F.C. footballers
Club Universidad Nacional footballers
C.S.D. Municipal players
Alianza F.C. footballers
Los Angeles Aztecs players
Uruguayan expatriate footballers
Expatriate footballers in Argentina
Expatriate footballers in Mexico
Expatriate footballers in El Salvador
Expatriate soccer players in the United States
Uruguayan expatriate sportspeople in El Salvador
Uruguayan expatriate sportspeople in Guatemala
Uruguayan expatriate sportspeople in Mexico
Uruguayan expatriate sportspeople in the United States
Uruguayan football managers
C.D. Suchitepéquez managers
Expatriate football managers in Costa Rica
Deportivo Saprissa managers
Expatriate football managers in El Salvador
Expatriate football managers in Guatemala
Guatemala national football team managers
Comunicaciones F.C. managers
C.D. Águila managers
Association football midfielders